Sophie Charlotte of Württemberg (22 February 1671 – 11 September 1717), was a German noblewoman of the House of Württemberg and by marriage Duchess of Saxe-Eisenach.

Born in Stuttgart, she was the ninth of eleven children of Eberhard III, Duke of Württemberg and his second wife, Countess Marie Dorothea Sophie of Oettingen-Oettingen. From Sophie Charlotte's ten full-siblings, only she and his three (unmarried) brothers George Frederick, Louis and John Frederick survive adulthood; in addition, they had fourteen older half-siblings from their father's first marriage with Anna Katharina, Wild- and Rheingräfin of Salm-Kyrburg, of whom only eight survived: Sophie Louise (by marriage Margravine of Brandenburg-Bayreuth), Christine Fredericka (by marriage Duchess of Oettingen-Oettingen), Christine Charlotte (by marriage Princess of East Frisia), William Louis, Duke of Württemberg, Anna Katharine (unmarried), Eberhardine Katharine (by marriage Duchess of Oettingen-Oettingen), Frederick Charles, Duke of Württemberg-Winnental and Karl Maximilian (unmarried).

Life
In Kirchheim unter Teck on 20 September 1688, Sophie Charlotte married John George II, Duke of Saxe-Eisenach. They had no children.

Duke John George II died of smallpox on 10 November 1698. Sophie Charlotte never remarried and survived him eighteen years. She died in Allstedt aged 46 and was buried in the Georgenkirche, Eisenach.

Notes

|-

House of Württemberg
House of Wettin
1671 births
1717 deaths
18th-century German people
Duchesses of Saxe-Eisenach
Daughters of monarchs